Betsy Leondar-Wright (born January 15, 1956) is an American economic justice activist, sociologist, and author, who writes on class and economic inequality.

Early life and education

Leondar-Wright was raised in a middle-class family, and dropped out of Princeton University to become a full-time activist. She completed her Bachelor of Arts, MA and PhD in Sociology at Boston College.

Activism

She was a member of Movement for a New Society (MNS), where she was a member of the Keystone Alliance, organizing rallies and occupations at the Limerick, PA Nuclear Power Plant. While involved with MNS, she published the "Study Guide on Multinational Corporations and the World Economy".

From 1986 to 1988 she was Program Coordinator at Women for Economic Justice, where she organized a coalition for pay equity for women. From 1988 to 1993 she was Executive Director at the Anti-Displacement Project, an affordable housing organization; three of the tenant groups she organized bought and now manage their apartment complexes as permanently affordable housing. From 1994 to 1997 she served as Executive Director of the Massachusetts Human Services Coalition.

From 1997 to 2006 she was Communications Director for United for a Fair Economy, where she co-authored The Color of Wealth: The Story Behind the U.S. Racial Wealth Divide.

She serves on the board of Class Action, a non-profit that raises consciousness about class and money. As Program Director from 2010 to 2015,  she edited the blog "Classism Exposed".

Current work

Currently she is an assistant professor of sociology at Lasell College. Her current research and writing focus on cross-class alliances in movements for social change.  Her 2012 PhD dissertation focuses on class culture differences in U.S. social change groups.  Her latest book, "Missing Class: Strengthening Social Movement Groups by Seeing Class Cultures" was published by Cornell University Press in April 2014 and was made into a website, the Activist Class Cultures Kit .

Personal life

She and her spouse, progressive book publicist Gail Leondar-Wright, are one of the first lesbian couples to be legally married in the United States.

Publishing history

See also
Classism
Ford Hall Forum
Wealth in the United States
LGBT

References

External links

Interview with Z Magazine
As forum speaker
Interview on Progressive Radio
Interview (with Gail Leondar-Wright) on Rag Radio with Thorne Dreyer (53:07)
consulting gail leondar public relations

Living people
American women's rights activists
American LGBT rights activists
American sociologists
American women sociologists
American non-fiction writers
American community activists
American anti-racism activists
1956 births
21st-century American women